Gennadiy Valyukevich (1 June 1958 – 30 December 2019) was a  triple jumper who represented the USSR and later Belarus. He won three medals at the European Indoor Championships.

He was the father of Dmitrij Valukevic, who currently represents Slovakia.

Achievements

External links

1958 births
2019 deaths
Belarusian male triple jumpers
Soviet male triple jumpers